The Schapendoes or Dutch Sheepdog, is a breed of dog originating in the Netherlands. The Schapendoes was originally a herding dog and general farm dog, but today also participates in dog sports such as agility and flyball.

History
The Schapendoes descends from a general type of farm and herding dog popular in the Drenthe province of the Netherlands, and the Veluwe, an area of forests and swampland. ("does" is a local dialect meaning "swamp" see e.g. the town of Doesburg) The dogs there had many names, and were not a specific breed as we use the term today. They were the local working dog, adapted to the people, environment, and types of work needed. They were exhibited in early dog shows (in the 1870s) as Domestic herding dog.

The dogs became nearly extinct during World War II, and the modern day breed descends from the few survivors. The Dutch Raad van Beheer (national kennel club) first recognised the breed in 1952, and the first standard was written in 1954. Related breeds are the Bearded Collie, the Puli, the Polish Lowland Sheepdog (Owczarek Nizinny), the Old English Sheepdog, the Briard, the Bergamasco Shepherd (Cane da pastore Bergamasco) and the Old German Sheepdog (Schafspudel), all of which are small versions of the "mountain type" herding and livestock guardian dogs.

The breed was recognised by the Fédération Cynologique Internationale in 1971, as breed number 313 in Group 1, Section 1: Sheepdogs. Exported to the North America, the breed is recognised by the Canadian Kennel Club (as Dutch Sheepdog) and the United Kennel Club (USA) in their respective Herding groups. The American Kennel Club has listed the Schapendoes as part of its Foundation Stock Service, the first step in breed recognition. Additionally, it is recognised by numerous minor kennel clubs and internet-based dog registry businesses.

Appearance
The Schapendoes is a medium-sized dog with long, thick fur on the body, legs, tail, and face. Small ears hang down, covered with long fur. The face has a moustache and beard. The coat is of any colour.

Height is up to 50 cm (19.7 in) at the withers and 12–20 kg (26–44 lb), up to 25 kg (55 lb) for males, in weight.

Temperament
The breed standard describes the Schapendoes as friendly, high spirited, and affectionate. He is not a guard dog or aggressively protective, and if properly socialised while young, would most likely make a good family dog, as well as a good dog for active sports. Lively and intelligent dogs must receive regular training and outings. Temperament of individual dogs may vary.
The Schapendoes is furthermore very independent and will cooperate with its trainer, rather than obey orders.

Health
Health problems or claims of exceptional health have not been documented for this breed. Before acquiring a puppy, make sure that sire and dame have all health clearances.

See also
 Dogs portal
 List of dog breeds

References

External links
 Schapendoes club in the Netherlands
  International Schapendoes Federation a group working to coordinate breed development internationally
 The American Kennel Club lists two breed clubs, but when the breed is accepted, there will be only one parent breed club. The Schapendoes Club USA will be vying with the Schapendoes Club of America

FCI breeds
Herding dogs
Dog breeds originating in the Netherlands
Rare dog breeds